Jidarzar (also Romanized as Jīdarzār; also known as Jīdarzāl) is a village in Kamfiruz-e Jonubi Rural District, Kamfiruz District, Marvdasht County, Fars Province, Iran. At the 2006 census, its population was 86, in 19 families.

References 

Populated places in Marvdasht County